Angus MacLachlan is a playwright and screenwriter most famous for writing the screenplays for the 2005 film Junebug and the cult short film Tater Tomater. He graduated from the North Carolina School of the Arts in 1980 and lives in Winston-Salem, North Carolina.  He adapted one of his plays into the film Stone, directed by John Curran and starring Robert De Niro, Milla Jovovich, and Edward Norton. It was released in 2010.

Tater Tomater 
Tater Tomater is a short student film that was directed by Phil Morrison while he was a student at NYU. The short is based on MacLachlan's stage play Behold Zebulon. It was first screened in 1989 at the Rialto Theater in Raleigh, North Carolina and in 1992, both screened at Sundance and aired on PBS's American Playhouse. The short stars Beth Bostic and Mary Lucy Bivins as two servers working in a cafeteria; Bostic continually asks customers if they want "taters" or "tomaters" until she has a mental breakdown. Since its premiere the short has received praise and taken on cult film status. A now-defunct website, tatertomater.com, was launched and allowed fans to take polls, sign a guestbook, or purchase a copy of the short film.

MacLachland and Morrison, who had grown up together in Winston-Salem, North Carolina, would later work together again for the 2005 film Junebug.

Filmography
 Junebug (2005)
 Stone (2010)
 Goodbye To All That (2014)
 Abundant Acreage Available (2017)
 A Little Prayer (2023)

References

External links

Oscar buzz could boost fortunes of W-S writer
Tater Tomater fan site

American male screenwriters
Living people
20th-century American dramatists and playwrights
University of North Carolina School of the Arts alumni
1959 births
American male dramatists and playwrights
20th-century American male writers